Amazing Azerbaijan! is a 2013 British documentary film directed by Liz Mermin and produced by Aisling Ahmed.

Synopsis 
Amazing Azerbaijan! pulls back the glittery facade that this oil-rich nation presented to the world when hosting Eurovision 2012, telling personal stories of human rights abuses to which Europe’s leaders have turned a blind eye. The film looks at Azerbaijan in the run-up to the 2012 Eurovision Song Contest, which took place in Baku. It features interviews with Eurovision contestants and aspiring contestants, politicians, human rights activists, investigative journalists, and members of the public, and contrasts the image the government presents to the outside world with first-person accounts of torture, arrest, and abuse by the government.

Production 
The film is directed by Liz Mermin, produced by Aisling Ahmed, edited by Herbert Hunger, and features music by James Burrell. It was broadcast across Europe during the week of Eurovision 2012. It is distributed by DR Sales Denmark  The film received a Bertha (now Doc Society) outreach grant, at which point it was lengthened to include an interview with the 2012 Eurovision song-contest winner Loreen.

Soundtracks 
The documentary has these songs/scores—
 And they shall rise
 My freedom

References

External links 
 
 

2013 films
German documentary films
Documentary films about politicians
Azerbaijani documentary films
Politics of Azerbaijan
2013 documentary films
Films about the Eurovision Song Contest
2010s English-language films
British documentary films
2010s British films
2010s German films